Jakob Horn (14 February 1867 – 24 February 1946) was a German mathematician who introduced Horn functions.

Works
  (123 pages)
  (59 pages)
 
 
 
  (237 pages)

References

External links

Jahrbuch für Mathematik (search on author: horn, j)

1867 births
19th-century German mathematicians
1946 deaths
20th-century German mathematicians